Lot and His Daughters is a c. 1621–1623 painting of Lot and his daughters by Orazio Gentileschi, now in the Thyssen-Bornemisza Museum in Madrid.

This version in Madrid is supposed to be painted by his assistants.

Seven different versions
Articles about the other versions of this painting are:
 Lot and His Daughters (Orazio Gentileschi, Berlin), 1622 (right daughter with red dress)
 Lot and His Daughters (Orazio Gentileschi, Los Angeles), 1622 (right daughter with yellow dress)
 Lot and His Daughters (Orazio Gentileschi, Bilbao), 1628 (cave ceiling with a hole, jug to the right, Lot's wife and lake on the background)

References

Paintings of Lot (biblical person)
1623 paintings
Paintings by Orazio Gentileschi
Paintings in the Thyssen-Bornemisza Museum